Progressive Advance is an anti-Chavista progressive political party in Venezuela, founded by former members of For Social Democracy (PODEMOS), Fatherland for All and the United Socialist Party of Venezuela in June 2012. The party's current general secretary is Juan José Molina.

See also
:Category:Progressive Advance politicians

References

External links
Official website

2012 establishments in Venezuela
Political parties established in 2012
Political parties in Venezuela
Progressive parties
Social democratic parties in Venezuela